A peri is a fairy-like creature in Middle Eastern and Asian mythology.

Peri may also refer to:

Arts and entertainment
 La Péri (Burgmüller), a ballet by Friedrich Burgmüller, Jean Coralli, and Théophile Gautier, first performed in 1843
 La Péri (Dukas), a ballet by Paul Dukas and Ivan Clustine, first performed in 1912
 Peri Brown, one of the companions in the TV series Doctor Who

Businesses
 Great Wall Peri, a car made by Chinese company Great Wall Motor
 PERI, one of the leading providers of formwork and scaffolding systems

Places
 Peri, Corse-du-Sud, a commune on Corsica, France
 Peri, Estonia, a village
 Peri, a village in Husnicioara Commune, Mehedinţi, Romania

People
 Peri (name), a surname and a given name

Other uses
 Political Economy Research Institute (PERI) at the University of Massachusetts Amherst
 Political Economy of Research and Innovation (PERI) an emerging academic field
 USS Peri (1861), a Union Navy ship of the American Civil War
 Partido Ecologista Radical Intransigente, acronym PERI, a Uruguayan green party
 Peri (substitution), a kind of naphthene ring modification peculiar to the naphthalene sub-type of naphthenes in molecular physics and chemistry
 Peri, a dialect of the Kalanga language, a Bantu language spoken in Botswana and Zimbabwe
 "peri", a colloquial term in the United Kingdom for a peripatetic teacher
 Peri Spiele, a former Austria board and card games manufacturer

See also
 Gyala Peri, a peak just beyond the eastern end of the Himalayas
 Pichal Peri, a popular topic for ghost stories in Central and South Asia
 Pari (disambiguation)
 Peary (disambiguation)
 Perri (disambiguation)
 Perrie (disambiguation), surname
 Perry (disambiguation)
 Pery, surname
 Piri (disambiguation)
 Piri piri, also spelled peri peri, the African bird's eye chili